The Glencairn whisky glass is a style of glass developed by Glencairn Crystal Ltd, Scotland for drinking whisky. Originally designed by Raymond Davidson, managing director of the company, the shape of the glass is derived from the traditional nosing copitas used in whisky labs around Scotland. The glass design was concluded with the aid of master blenders from five of the largest whisky companies in Scotland. The glass first came into production in 2001. Since that time additional mini-Glencairns and Canadian Glencairns were introduced.

The vast majority of glasses in circulation are of the lead-free crystal variety. The soda-lime variation was discontinued in 2008. Mini Glencairns look the same as regular Glencairns but are smaller and used at distilleries for serving samples. Canadian Glencairns are the largest of the three, and were made for Canadian whiskey that is usually served on the rocks (with ice), therefore the Canadian Glencairn has a wider bowl and has a  capacity.

In 2006 the glass won the Queen's Award for innovation.

The Glencairn glass is not the only glass on the market that is designed specifically for drinking whisky. (For example, Riedel and Norlan Glass also manufacture such glassware.) While there are numerous styles of such glasses available, the Glencairn is the first style to be endorsed by the Scotch Whisky Association, and it is used by every whisky company in Scotland and Ireland.

Old fashioned tumblers, snifters, and nosing copitas are other types of glasses that are commonly used for drinking whisky. The traditional style of whisky glass is a cut glass crystal (also known as an "old fashioned glass", "rocks glass" or "lowball glass" in the United States), an iconic design that remains the most commonly used type of whisky glass. However, a tumbler does not hold and focus the aromas as much for the experience of the drinker as the other styles, which curve inwards towards the top of the glass. While not all drinkers may find the strong aroma produced by such glasses desirable, inward-curved glasses are often preferred by connoisseurs who consider the aroma especially important to the experience of a whisky.

References

External links

Glencairn Glass U.S. Design Patent (Publication Date: 25 June 2002, Filing Date: 26 September 2001, Term: 14 years from the date of issue.) 

Drinking glasses
Whisky
Drinkware